Torrenticola may refer to:
 Torrenticola (mite), a genus of arachnids in the family Torrenticolidae
 Torrenticola, a genus of flowering plants in the family Podostemaceae; synonym of Cladopus